Bhaktha Sabari is a 1960 Indian Telugu-language film directed by Ch. Narayanamoorthi based on a screenplay by K. M. Govindarajan. The film was produced by P. R. Naidu under the banner of Sugibava Productions. The film stars Ashokan, Pandari Bai, V. Nagayya, and L. Vijayalakshmi. The film features original songs composed by Pendyala Nageswara Rao, with cinematography by K. V. S. Reddy. The film was supposed to be Sobhan Babu's debut film, but Daiva Balam (1959), was released earlier at the box office.

Cast 
The list was adapted from the database of Film News Anandan

Male cast
Ashokan
V. Nagayya
Harinath
Ramakrishna
Nagesh

Female cast
Pandari Bai
L. Vijayalakshmi
T. R. Saroja
Rajshree (Debut)

Production 

The film was produced by P. R. Naidu and the production company was Sugibava Productions. Ch. Narayanamoorthi directed the film while K. V. S. Reddy was in charge of the cinematography.
The film was produced in Telugu-language with the same title but with a different cast.

Soundtrack 
The music was composed by Pendyala Nageswara Rao. Surabhi, Nallathamby and Adhimoolam wrote the lyrics. Playback singers are: P. B. Srinivas, Sirkazhi Govindarajan, Radha Jayalakshmi, P. Susheela and K. Jamuna Rani.

References

External links 
 - A song from the film

1960s Tamil-language films